Homer Township is one of the seventeen townships of Medina County, Ohio, United States.  The 2000 census found 1,461 people in the township.

Geography
Located in the part of the county, it borders the following townships:
Spencer Township - north
Chatham Township - northeast corner
Harrisville Township - east
Congress Township, Wayne County - southeast
Jackson Township, Ashland County - southwest
Sullivan Township, Ashland County - west
Huntington Township, Lorain County - northwest corner

No municipalities are located in Homer Township, although the unincorporated community of Homerville lies at the center of the township.

Name and history
Homer Township was established in 1839, and named after Homer, an ancient Greek poet. Statewide, the only other Homer Township is located in Morgan County.

Government
The township is governed by a three-member board of trustees, who are elected in November of odd-numbered years to a four-year term beginning on the following January 1. Two are elected in the year after the presidential election and one is elected in the year before it. There is also an elected township fiscal officer, who serves a four-year term beginning on April 1 of the year after the election, which is held in November of the year before the presidential election. Vacancies in the fiscal officership or on the board of trustees are filled by the remaining trustees.

References

External links

Townships in Medina County, Ohio
Townships in Ohio